Ray Farris was a college football player.

University of North Carolina
Farris was a prominent guard for the North Carolina Tar Heels of the University of North Carolina. He was known as a multi-threat guard because he could also do the work of a back.  One Dr. R. B. Lawson picked Farris as a guard on his all-time North Carolina football team.

1929
He was captain and All-Southern in 1929. The 1929 team scored a record 346 points. Farris was also selected as a third-team All-American.  The 1929 season was seen as a great turnaround for the UNC football team, led by the "hell-for-leather guard" Farris. He wore #99.

1930
In 1930 he coached the school's freshman team.

Politics
Also in 1930 he "jumped from college to politics" as an organizer for the state young people's democratic organization.

References

American football guards
North Carolina Tar Heels football players
All-Southern college football players
Year of birth missing
North Carolina Tar Heels football coaches